The Crown of the King of Bavaria is a part of the Bavarian Crown Jewels and was ordered and designed between 1804 and 1807 for Maximilian I after Napoleon had raised Bavaria to kingdom status.

It was commissioned to the French goldsmith Jean-Baptiste de Lasne, who drew inspiration from the Crown of Louis XV of France.
Maximilian's alliance with Emperor Napoleon earned him the royal title and vast territorial increases at the Treaty of Pressburg (1805). This made him one of the chief members of the Confederation of the Rhine. His daughter was married to Napoleon's stepson, Eugène de Beauharnais.

Maximilian I ordered the regalia which can be seen today in the Treasury at the Residenz in Munich. Made by Biennais, the most famous French goldsmith of the day, the Royal Crown of Bavaria is set with rubies, diamonds, emeralds, sapphires and pearls. The Wittelsbach Diamond was removed and sold in 1931 by the Wittelsbach family.

Like other royal insignia, the crown was not worn by the sovereign. It was placed on a cushion during official ceremonies.

External links
The Crown. residenz-muenchen.de

Bavaria
Kingdom of Bavaria
Munich Residenz